Stewart J. Malgunas (born April 21, 1970) is a Canadian former professional ice hockey defenceman who played 129 games in the National Hockey League (NHL) with the Philadelphia Flyers, Winnipeg Jets, Washington Capitals and Calgary Flames.

Playing career
Originally selected in the 1990 NHL Entry Draft by the Detroit Red Wings, Malgunas was traded to the Philadelphia Flyers and made his NHL debut during the 1993–94 season.

Career statistics

Awards
 WHL West First All-Star Team – 1990

External links
 

1970 births
Living people
Adirondack Red Wings players
Calgary Flames players
Canadian ice hockey defencemen
Detroit Red Wings draft picks
Detroit Vipers players
Frankfurt Lions players
Hershey Bears players
Sportspeople from Prince George, British Columbia
New Westminster Bruins players
Philadelphia Flyers players
Portland Pirates players
Seattle Thunderbirds players
Utah Grizzlies (IHL) players
Washington Capitals players
Winnipeg Jets (1979–1996) players
Ice hockey people from British Columbia
Canadian expatriate ice hockey players in Germany
Canadian expatriate ice hockey players in the United States